Cephalochrysa similis is a species of soldier fly in the family Stratiomyidae.

Distribution
United States.

References

Stratiomyidae
Diptera of North America
Insects described in 1936